Brian Kelly (born 3 November 1978, in York, England) is an international chess player. Although born in England, he moved to Limerick, Republic of Ireland when he was 2 years old, and later to Belfast, Northern Ireland when he was 12. Both his parents hold Irish citizenship and he can compete for Ireland in international competitions.

He attained the title of International Master in 1998. His current FIDE rating is 2488, with a highest rating of 2504 achieved in July 2005.

Kelly won the Irish Chess Championship twice, outright in 1995 and jointly in 2007. In  1994, he won a gold medal at the Chess Olympiad playing on Board 6 for Ireland, as well as sharing first place in the Ulster Chess Championship.

As of September 2006 he is rated as the strongest native Irish chess player, although he placed behind others such as Alexander McDonnell on the all-time list. He has captained both the Methodist College Belfast and Cambridge University teams during his career. He holds the record for the highest score earned by an Irish player in the British Chess Championship.

He is also a Go player, and has achieved the rank of second kyu whilst playing in the UK, making him one of the strongest Irish Go players.

References

1978 births
Living people
British chess players
Irish chess players
Chess International Masters
Sportspeople from Belfast
People educated at Methodist College Belfast